Graham Johnson Lake (born 13 April 1935) is a retired scientist known for his contributions to understanding rubber's fatigue limit, and a former professional English cricketer.

Scientific career
Lake began his scientific career as a research assistant in 1958 at the British Rubber Producer's Research Association.  During his employment at BRPRA, he attended evening classes at the University of London, achieving a B.Sc. in Physics in 1962, and a Ph.D. in 1967.  He undertook fundamental studies of the fatigue properties of elastomers, and established the principle that fatigue cracks develop from pre-existing features of rubber's microstructure, in accordance with the expectations of Fracture Mechanics. Together with doctoral student Oon Hock Yeoh he also studied the mechanics of cutting of rubber with a blade, thereby establishing the principle that rubber's intrinsic strength and fatigue limit are the same and that they can be measured via cutting experiments.  

Lake received the 1995 Colwyn medal. In 2003, he received the Charles Goodyear Medal in recognition of the significance of his contributions to rubber science.

A symposium was organized in 2003 to honor the 50th anniversary of the development of Fracture Mechanics for rubber, and the symposium title was chosen as 'Fracture Mechanics and Elastomers: 50 not out', in reference to Lake's past career as a pro cricketer.

Cricket

Lake was a right-handed batsman who bowled right-arm fast-medium. He was born in Croydon, Surrey.

Lake made his first-class debut for Gloucestershire against Sussex in the 1956 County Championship.  He made 12 further first-class appearances, the last of which came against Oxford University in 1958.  In his 13 first-class matches, he scored 106 runs at an average of 7.57, with a high score of 18.  With the ball, he took 17 wickets at a bowling average of 27.29, with best figures of 4/39.

References

External links
Graham Lake at ESPNcricinfo
Graham Lake at CricketArchive

1935 births
Living people
Polymer scientists and engineers
Cricketers from Croydon
English cricketers
Gloucestershire cricketers